Hwangseong-dong is both an administrative and legal dong or a neighbourhood in the administrative subdivisions of the Gyeongju City, North Gyeongsang province, South Korea. It is bordered by Yonggang-dong on the east, Hyeongok-myeon on the west and north and Seongnae-dong on the south. Its 3.84 square kilometers are home to about 29,140 people. It has two elementary schools, three middle schools and one high school

See also
Subdivisions of Gyeongju
Administrative divisions of South Korea

References

External links
 The official site of the Hwangseong-dong office

Subdivisions of Gyeongju
Neighbourhoods in South Korea